Mohammad Ibrahim Malikzada (محمد ابراهیم ملکزاده) (born 1966) was an Afghan politician and military commander. He was the first Governor of Ghor after the defeat of the Taliban in 2001. Malikzada completed elementary education in Ghor province. During Jihad, in 1960s, he continued his Science and Islamic education and he acquired expertise in Medicine from (ICC). He was involved in the health services according to the needs of the region until the Fall of 1981, after Mohammad Taher Malikzada, his elder brother was martyred. From that point on, Mohammad Ibrahim Malikzada took the military responsibility. Although he was not a military officer, he turned into a fully-fledged inclusive militant. The terrible wars of the region fueled by the totalitarians forced him to respond vigorously to the Taliban attacks after 1979. After, Ahmad Shah Massoud, he was the only figure in all the provinces of Southern and Western Afghanistan continuing his resistance. After the fall of Taliban in 2001, he served as the governor of Ghor province. In the first parliamentary elections in Afghanistan, he was elected as a member of a House of People for the Ghor province.

Malikzada is the son of Abdul Rahman Malikzada. Mohammad Ibrahim Malikzada is of Tajik descent.

References

Living people
Governors of Ghor Province
1966 births